Ufuk Budak (born 26 May 1990) is an Azerbaijani professional footballer who plays as a left-back for Erzurumspor.

Personal life
Budak is of ethnic Turkish descent.

References

External links 
 

1990 births
People from Heidenheim
Sportspeople from Stuttgart (region)
Footballers from Baden-Württemberg
Azerbaijani people of Turkish descent
German people of Turkish descent
Living people
Azerbaijani footballers
Association football midfielders
Azerbaijan international footballers
Azerbaijan under-21 international footballers
German footballers
SSV Ulm 1846 players
SC Freiburg II players
Eskişehirspor footballers
Gaziantep F.K. footballers
Kayserispor footballers
Manisaspor footballers
Samsunspor footballers
Boluspor footballers
Altınordu F.K. players
Bursaspor footballers
Büyükşehir Belediye Erzurumspor footballers
Regionalliga players
TFF First League players
Süper Lig players
Azerbaijani expatriate footballers
Azerbaijani expatriate sportspeople in Turkey
Expatriate footballers in Turkey